Consort Yu (1730–1774), of the Mongol Oirat Borjigin Clan, was a Consort of the Qianlong Emperor. She was 18 or 19 years his junior.

Life 
Lady Oirat Borjigin (博爾濟吉特氏) was born in 1730. Her exact date of birth is not known. She grew up in Mongolia but in 1757 she entered the Forbidden City as a Palace Maid. In 1758 she married the Qianlong Emperor as a Concubine and was established as a Noble Lady, being titled "Noble Lady Duo" (多貴人) . In 1759 Lady Oirat Borjigin got pregnant with her husband's child, but she miscarried and to comfort her the Emperor promoted her to that of "Imperial Concubine Yu" (豫嬪). Five years later, in 1764, she was promoted to the position of "Consort Yu" (豫妃), the title she would hold until her death in 1774, at the age of forty-three or forty-four. Consort Yu received no posthumous promotions or honors.

Titles 
In the reign of the Yongzheng Emperor (1722–1735):

 Lady Oirat Borjigin (from 1730)

In the reign of the Qianlong Emperor (1735–1796):

 Maid (1757)
 Noble Lady Duo (1758)
 Imperial Concubine Yu (1759)
 Consort Yu (1764)

References 

Consorts of the Qianlong Emperor
1730 births
1774 deaths